The Loudwater Mystery is a 1921 British silent crime film directed by Walter West and starring Gregory Scott, Pauline Peters and Clive Brook. It was based on the 1920 novel The Loudwater Mystery by Edgar Jepson.

Plot
A detective investigating the death of an aristocrat eventually deduces he was murdered by his secretary.

Cast
 Gregory Scott as Hubert Manley 
 Pauline Peters as Lady Loudwater 
 Clive Brook as Lord Loudwater 
 Cameron Carr as Inspector Flexen 
 Charles Tilson-Chowne as Colonel Grey 
 Arthur Walcott as Carrington 
 Nan Heriot as Miss Truslove 
 Charles Poulton as Roper

References

Bibliography
 Low, Rachael. History of the British Film, 1918-1929. George Allen & Unwin, 1971.

External links

1921 films
British silent feature films
British crime films
British mystery films
Films directed by Walter West
Films based on British novels
Broadwest films
Films set in England
British black-and-white films
1921 crime films
1920s English-language films
1920s British films
Silent mystery films
Silent crime films